Lingadahalli Subrahmanya Shashidhara (born 1963), currently the Centre Director of National Centre for Biological Sciences, Bengaluru, India, is an Indian developmental biologist, geneticist and a professor of biology. He is a Professor at the Indian Institute of Science Education and Research, Pune, and at Ashoka University, Sonepat, India.[3]. He heads the LSS Laboratory at IISER and is known for his studies on Drosophila, particularly Evolution of appendages and functions of homeotic selector genes. He is a J. C. Bose National Fellow of the Department of Science and Technology and an elected fellow of the Indian National Science Academy, Indian Academy of Sciences and the National Academy of Sciences, India. The Council of Scientific and Industrial Research, the apex agency of the Government of India for scientific research, awarded him the Shanti Swarup Bhatnagar Prize for Science and Technology, one of the highest Indian science awards, in 2008, for his contributions to biological sciences.

In 2018, L.S. Shashidhara has been elected an Associate Member of European Molecular Biology Organization (EMBO), making him the third scientist from India to join a group of about 1800 researchers from Europe and around the world.

L. S. Shashidhara is elected as the president of the International Union of Biological Sciences (IUBS) in the 33rd General Assembly of IUBS held during the Centenary Year Event of IUBS, at Oslo, in 2019. On behalf of IUBS, Shashidhara is steering an international project on Climate Change Education (titled as TROP ICSU). This project is supported by many unions and UN organizations.

Biography 
L. S. Shashidhara, born on 23 March 1963 in the south Indian state of Karnataka, graduated in science from University of Agricultural Sciences, Dharwad (UAS) in 1985 and obtained a master's degree in Genetics and Plant breeding in 1987 from the same university. After a brief stint (1987–88) at UAS as a teaching associate, he moved to University of Cambridge in 1988 for his doctoral studies to secure a PhD in 1991. On completion of his post-doctoral studies at Cambridge (1991–93), he returned to India to join National Centre for Biological Sciences and worked as a visiting fellow for two years. Subsequently, he moved to Centre for Cellular and Molecular Biology (CCMB) in 1995 as a scientist (group leader) where he served until 2007 when he was transferred, on deputation, to the Pune centre of Indian Institutes of Science Education and Research (IISER) as a professor. Since then, he has been serving the institute as a professor and has served as the chair of Biology and the coordinator of the department of biology. He pursues his research interests as the head of the LSS Laboratory at IISER, where he hosts a number doctoral and postdoctoral scholars. He also serves as an honorary professor at Jawaharlal Nehru Centre for Advanced Scientific Research. He served as the vice-president of the Indian National Science Academy from 2015 to 2017 and Secretary General of the International Union of Biological Sciences from 2015-2019.

Legacy 

Shashidhara's researches were focused on developmental biology, specifically the development of limbs and the role played by Ultrabithorax, a Hox gene, functioning as a transcription factor. Studying Drosophila melanogaster (commonly known as fruit fly) as a model, he elucidated the molecular pathways Wnt, TGF-? and EGFR/Ras that impact the growth control and developed a fly model for studying Adenomatous polyposis coli, the colon cancer gene in humans. His studies are reported to have assisted in a wider understanding of the relation between genes and diseases in humans and in the development of cancer drug discovery systems. His research findings have been published in a number of articles published in peer-reviewed journals, several of them have been listed in online article repositories such as Metascience, PubMed, and ResearchGate. He has also published many general articles on adacemics and has delivered keynote addresses and featured talks. He served as the secretary-general of the International Union of Biological Sciences (IUBS), during 2015–2019 and is associated with the Journal of Genetics and Current Science as their associate editor and with Scientific Reports as a member of its editorial board.

Awards and honours 
Shashidhara, a J. C. Bose National Fellow of the Department of Science and Technology, received the Technology Prize in Biological Sciences of the Council of Scientific and Industrial Research in 2003 and the Outstanding Research Investigator Award of the Science Research Council of the Department of Atomic Energy in 2006. The Indian academy of Sciences elected him as a fellow in 2007 and he became an elected fellow of the Indian National Science Academy and the National Academy of Sciences, India in 2008. The same year he received the Shanti Swarup Bhatnagar Prize of the Council of Scientific and Industrial Research, one of the highest Indian science awards, for his contributions to Biological Sciences. In 2018, L.S. Shashidhara has been elected an Associate Member of European Molecular Biology Organization (EMBO). He is currently elected as the president of  International Union Of Biological Sciences.

Selected bibliography

Scientific articles 

 Vaid et al. (2022). Evaluation of tumor‑infiltrating lymphocytes (TILs) in molecular subtypes of an Indian cohort of breast cancer patients. Diagnostics Pathology. https://doi.org/10.1186/s13000-022-01271-y. (MedRxiv. doi:https://doi.org/10.1101/2020.08.19.20177865.)

 Mave et al. (2022). Association of national and regional lockdowns with COVID-19 infection rates in Pune, India. Scientific Reports 12, Article number: 10446. https://www.nature.com/articles/s41598-022-14674-0.

 Bogam, P., Joshi, J., Nagarkar, S., Jain, D., Gupte, N., Shashidhara, L.S., Monteiro, J.M. and Mave, V. (2021). The burden of COVID-19 and Case Fatality Rate in Pune India: An Analysis of First and Second Wave of the Pandemic.  International Journal of Infectious Diseases (IJID) Regions, 2, 2022, 74-81. https://doi.org/10.1016/j.ijregi.2021.12.006.

 Rahman, A. and Shashidhara, L.S. (2021). Analyzing the influence of IL18 in regulation of YAP1 in breast oncogenesis using cBioportal. Cancer Reports. e1484. DOI: 10.1002/cnr2.1484.  

 Chakraborty, A., Kumar, S., Shashidhara, L.S. and Taneja, A. (2021). Building Sustainable Societies through Purpose-Driven Universities: A Case Study from Ashoka University (India). Sustainability. 13, 7423. https://doi.org/10.3390/su13137423.

 Busheri, L., Dixit, S., ..….., Shashidhara, L.S., Koppiker, C.B. and Kulkarni, M. “Breast Cancer Biobank from a Single Institutional cohort in an Urban Setting in India: Tumor Characteristics and Survival Outcomes.” Cancer Treatment and Research 28 (2021) 100409. https://doi.org/10.1016/j.ctarc.2021.100409.

 Paul, R., Giraud, G., Domsch, K., Duffraisse, M., Marmigère, F., Khan, S., Lohmann, I., Stoks, R., Shashidhara, L.S. and Merabet, S. (2021). Hox dosage and the control of flight appendage morphology in insects. Nature Communications (12, 2892. https://doi.org/10.1038/s41467-021-23293-8.

 Nagarkar, S., Wasnik, R., Govada, P., Cohen, S.M. and Shashidhara, L.S. (2020). Promoter proximal pausing limits Yki-induced tumorous growth in Drosophila. Genetics. 216, 67-77. https://doi.org/10.1534/genetics.120.303419.

 Groth, C., Vaid, P., Khatpe, A., Prashali, N., Ahiya, A., Andrejeva, D., Chakladar, M., Nagarkar, S., Paul, R., Kelkar, D., Eichenlaub, T., Herranz, H., Sridhar, T.S., Cohen, S.M., and Shashidhara, L.S. (2020) Genome-wide RNAi screen for context-dependent tumor suppressors identified using in vivo models for neoplasia in Drosophila.G3: Genes, Genomes, Genetics. 10, 2999-3008. https://doi.org/10.1534/g3.120.401545.

 Kulkarni, A., Kelkar, D.A., Parikh, N., Shashidhara, L.S., Koppiker, C.B. and Kulkarni, M. (2020). Meta-analysis of prevalence of Triple-Negative breast cancer and its clinical features at incidence in Indian patients with breast cancer. JCO Global Oncology 2020 :6, 1052-1062.  https://doi.org/10.1200/go.20.00054
De las Heras, J.M., Garcia-Cortes, C., Foronda, D., Pastor-Pareja, J.C., Shashidhara, L.S. and Sanchez-Herrero, E. (2018). The Drosophila Hox gene Ultrabithorax controls appendage shape by regulating extracellular matrix dynamics. Development (doi: 10.1242/dev.161844). 
Shukla, J.P., Deshpande, G. and Shashidhara, L.S. (2017). Ataxin-2 binding protein 1 is a context-specific positive regulator of Notch signaling during neurogenesis in Drosophila melanogaster. Development (doi: 10.1242/dev.140657).
Singh, S., Sánchez-Herrero, E. and Shashidhara, L.S. (2015). Critical role for Fat/Hippo and IIS/Akt pathways downstream of Ultrabithorax during haltere specification in Drosophila. Mechanisms of Development 138 (Pt 2), 198–209.

General Articles, Books and Policy Documents 
 
L. S. Shashidhara (2010) Convener, Vision Group of INSA which drafted a Vision document for Indian Science in 2010
 
 
 
 
 
 
 
(2017–18) Commissioned and Edited, an anthology on "Impact of Science in Independent India"
L. S. Shashidhara (10 January 2017) Co-author: "Scientific advancements in Independent India. Current Science, Vol. 112"

Selected Videos and Podcasts 
"Science for Society: Science to Fight Covid-19 and Cancer: Perspectives from Pune", by Pune International Center (2021)
"A journey in science...a journey in life", by BIIS (2021)
"Science on the Pandemic and Science through the Pandemic", a webinar as a part of the Vigyan Setu Webinar Series by INSA-INYAS (2020)
"Gender Equality in Science", a podcast by the International Science Council, as a part of the celebration of 'International Day of Women and Girls in Science', at UNESCO (2020)
"COVID-19 and Animals: doubts clarified", by Talking It Up (2020)
"Leadership and  Mentoring", at the  Science Leadership Workshop, (2020)
"SDGs Learning, Training & Practice" as a part of the High-level Political Forum, by the United Nations (2019)
 "Why and how to integrate research and education?", uploaded by IndiaBioScience (2019)
 "QnA session with Professor L S Shashidhara, IISER Pune", uploaded by LivingScience (2016)
 "Eureka with Prof L S Shashidhara", uploaded by Rajya Sabha Television, an Indian public broadcast service (2016)
 "Impact of Science on Society", uploaded by LivingScience (2016)
 "NCBS Talk 1", uploaded by Bangalore Life Sciences Cluster (2010)

See also 

 Drosophila melanogaster 
 Homeotic selector gene
 Adenomatous polyposis coli
 Ultrabithorax

Notes

References

External links 
 
 

Recipients of the Shanti Swarup Bhatnagar Award in Biological Science
1963 births
Scientists from Karnataka
Alumni of the University of Cambridge
Academic staff of the National Centre for Biological Sciences
20th-century Indian biologists
Indian geneticists
Indian scientific authors
Fellows of the Indian Academy of Sciences
Fellows of the Indian National Science Academy
Fellows of The National Academy of Sciences, India
Living people
Academic staff of the Indian Institute of Science Education and Research, Pune
Presidents of the International Union of Biological Sciences